The Sarang Buaya River is a river in Johor, Malaysia.

See also
 Sarang Buaya

References

Muar District
Rivers of Johor